The 1978–79 Serie A season was the 45th season of the Serie A, the top level of ice hockey in Italy. Nine teams participated in the league, and HC Bolzano won the championship.

Regular season

External links
 Season on hockeytime.net

1978–79 in Italian ice hockey
Serie A (ice hockey) seasons
Italy